The Telford steam tram at the Telford Steam Railway of the Telford Horsehay Steam Trust, runs on a  narrow gauge track. This follows a short circular route, part of which runs near to the lake known as Horsehay Pool. Prior to the completion of the circle after arriving near the loco shed, it paused very briefly before returning, coach first, to the starting point near the entrance.

The tram and 16-seat coach were built by Alan Keef Ltd for the Telford Development Corporation, first running on Saturday 8 September 1979. The tram moved to its present site in the mid-1980s.

Steam trams were at one time a fairly familiar sight, as in the last years of the 19th century and the early years of the 20th century, they were used in several towns and cities in the UK. Most were eventually replaced by electric trams. The steam tram at the Telford Steam Railway, is one of the very few working examples, and quite possibly the only narrow gauge one in the UK. It is 4-wheeled and Pontie Steam Plant Ltd of Peterborough built its vertical boiler and  x  cylinder.

External links 

Telford Steam Railway – official website

References 

Heritage railways in Shropshire
Telford
2 ft gauge railways in England